This Space Between Us is a 1999 film directed by Matthew Leutwyler and starring Jeremy Sisto and Poppy Montgomery. It won the Moxie Award at the 2000 Santa Monica Film Festival.

Cast
Jeremy Sisto as Alex Harty
Poppy Montgomery as Arden Anfield
Erik Palladino as Jesse Fleer
Clara Bellar as Zoe Goddard
Vincent Ventresca as Sterling Montrose

References

External links

1999 films
Films directed by Matthew Leutwyler
1999 romantic comedy films
American romantic comedy films
1990s English-language films
1990s American films